Heterochorista chrysonetha is a species of moth of the family Tortricidae. It is found in the Papua province of Indonesia on the island of New Guinea.

References

Moths described in 1953
Archipini